Brett Matthews (5 July 1962 – 31 January 2013) was a South African cricketer. He played 38 first-class and 33 List A matches between 1984 and 1990.

References

External links
 

1962 births
2013 deaths
South African cricketers
Eastern Province cricketers
Gauteng cricketers
Western Province cricketers
Cricketers from Cape Town